Streptomyces afghaniensis is a bacterium species from the genus of Streptomyces which has been isolated from soil in Afghanistan. Streptomyces afghaniensis produces the antibiotic taitomycin.

See also 
 List of Streptomyces species

References

Further reading

External links
Type strain of Streptomyces afghaniensis at BacDive -  the Bacterial Diversity Metadatabase

afghaniensis
Bacteria described in 1959